Arthur Horner may refer to:

Arthur Horner (cartoonist) (1916–1997), Australian cartoonist
Arthur Horner (trade unionist) (1894–1968), Welsh trade union leader and communist politician